The 1913 Major League Baseball season was contested from April 9 to October 11, 1913. The New York Giants and Philadelphia Athletics were the regular season champions of the National League and American League, respectively. The Athletics then defeated the Giants in the World Series, four games to one.

This was the third of four seasons that the Chalmers Award, a precursor to the Major League Baseball Most Valuable Player Award (introduced in 1931), was given to a player in each league.

Awards and honors
Chalmers Award
Walter Johnson, Washington Senators, SP
 Jake Daubert, Brooklyn Dodgers, 1B

Statistical leaders

Standings

American League

National League

Postseason

Bracket

Managers

American League

National League

Events

May 30 – Harry Hooper of the Boston Red Sox becomes the first player to hit a home run as the lead-off hitter in both games of a doubleheader, against the Washington Senators.
October 4 – Against the Boston Red Sox, the Washington Senators use eight pitchers including infielder Germany Schaefer, catcher Eddie Ainsmith, outfielder Joe Gedeon and manager Clark Griffith. Despite the use of these non-pitchers, the Senators win the game 10–9.

References

External links 
1913 Major League Baseball season schedule at Baseball Reference Retrieved January 14, 2018

 
Major League Baseball seasons